Raith Rovers finished the 2007–08 season third in the Scottish Second Division with 47 points. Graham Weir was the top scorer with 12 goals. The club were involved in the Scottish First Division play-offs against Airdrie United with the second leg on 3 May ending 2–2. Raith lost the home leg 2–0 on 30 April.

Match results
Raith Rovers have played a total of 42 competitive matches during the 2007–08 season,. The team finished third in the Scottish Second Division and are currently involved in the Scottish First Division play-offs.

In the cup competitions, Rovers lost in the second round of the CIS Cup to Motherwell. St Johnstone knocked Rovers out of both the Scottish Cup and Challenge Cup, in the fourth and first rounds respectively.

Legend

All results are written with Raith Rovers's score first.

Irn-Bru Second Division

Playoffs

Scottish Cup

Match vs St Johnstone rearranged (postponed from 12 January)

CIS Insurance Cup

Challenge Cup

St Johnstone won 5–4 on penalties

Player statistics
During the 2007–08 season, Rovers have used 26 different players on the pitch. Craig Wilson is the only player to have played in every match. The table below shows the number of appearances and goals scored by each player.

After 2008-03-15:

|}

Goalscorers
Thirteen players have scored for the Rovers first team with the team scoring 70 goals in total so far. The top goalscorer is Graham Weir with 12 goals.

Discipline
During the 2007–08 season, three Rovers players have been sent off and 18 have received at least one caution. In total, the team have received three red cards and 52 yellows.

Team statistics

League table

Transfers

In
Raith Rovers signed three players on loan during the season:

Loans in

Out
Raith loaned out one player during the season:

Loans out

Playing kit

References

External links
 Official site
 Club stats BBC Sport
 Soccerbase: 
 Results 
 Squad stats 
Transfers

Raith Rovers F.C. seasons
Raith Rovers